The Waikato Plains form a large area of low-lying land in the northwest of the North Island of New Zealand. They are the alluvial plains of the ancient Waikato River, the country's longest river that over the last 1800 years has changed course many times. In the distant past the river flowed northeast from the current Lake Karapiro, exiting near Thames, but in recent times it has flowed northwest to empty into the Tasman Sea near Port Waikato.

The plains can be divided roughly into the Waikato Basin (or Middle Waikato Plain), extending in all directions around the city of Hamilton, and the Lower Waikato Plain, nearer the river's mouth. The two are broken by the rough, low-lying hills of the Hakarimata Range, between Ngāruawāhia and Huntly, and the Taupiri Range.

The region is heavily populated by New Zealand standards, with over 250,000 people in approximately 8000 km² area. Just over half of these live in Hamilton.

The plains are an area of once swampy  land, which was drained by the early settlers, such as the Morrin brothers in the late 18th century and is now intensively farmed. Dairy cattle, sheep, grain and maize are all farmed here, but it is dairy farming that is the staple of the local economy. The lower plain is also known for vineyards, and the middle plain has some of the southern hemisphere's top thoroughbred stables, notably around the towns of Cambridge and Matamata.

A considerable amount of the land is peaty, and significant sections especially in the north east are still undrained swamp. Dozens shallow riverine lakes lie at the central and southern end of the lower plain, notably Lake Waikare.

References

Landforms of Waikato
Plains of New Zealand